George Dashnau (October 12, 1923 – February 9, 2001) was an advertising executive in Philadelphia who started the first mail order delivery service that supplied human skulls. He was 55 years old when he started the business.

Business
Dashnau sold human skulls for $100 each in the 1970s, which he claimed to be from a medical supply firm that wanted to be nameless. The business was based out of his post office box under the trade name The Skull Man. He started the business because he wanted to become rich, a dream that he had had for many years, and he credited that being a science fiction fan may have helped him think of the idea. Dashnau said that he tried to think of the skulls as old bones and not as people. He did not sell the skulls for medical purposes, but rather as novelty items. Roger Simmons, of the Chicago Sun-Times, asked Dashnau why he would not reveal where the skulls were from. Dashnau said that he would not reveal where they came from because he did not want imitators using the same supplies.

Human skulls
Each skull was treated to prevent decalcification. The cranium was made so that people could view the lower brain cavity and the lower jaw was fastened with springs which allowed someone to open and close the mouth. Dashnau had no idea how old the skulls were or where they came from, but that people bought them as pieces for conversation. Two of Dashnau's hopes were that business executives would buy a skull as an unusual desk ornament and to be able to expand his offered merchandise, including full human skeletons for $500 each.

Death
Dashnau died on February 9, 2001, due to a stroke in Willingboro Township, New Jersey. He was buried at Monument Cemetery in Beverly, New Jersey, on February 14, 2001.

Bibliography
In 1979 and again in a 1981 edition, Dashnau had an entry in the book Famous Americans You Never Knew Existed. In 1990, Dashnau had an entry in the book Best Of Gravestone Humor.

References

1923 births
2001 deaths
Businesspeople from Philadelphia
Mail-order retailers
Companies established in the 1970s
20th-century American businesspeople